Pachycereus pecten-aboriginum (commonly known as hairbrush or Indian comb) is a columnar cactus plant native to Mexico. The trunk of this species is 1.2 to 5.0 m tall and the fruits are large and burr-like. The specific name, pecten-aboriginum, is from the Latin, and means "native combs". It was inspired by the use of the fruits as hair combs.

Distribution
P. pecten-aboriginum is endemic to Mexico. Its range extends throughout the western states from Baja California to Chiapas. It grows in the Chihuahuan and Sonoran Deserts, the thorn forest of Sinaloa, and the southern Sonoran plains.

Habitat
P.  pecten-aboriginum is found on slopes and plains, and in valleys and arroyos. Its habitat includes thornscrubs, tropical deciduous forests, and Sonoran desert scrub. It grows on flat land and hills and in canyons. It is abundant in the subtropical scrub of southern Sonora, particularly in the foothills and lower mountains.

Description
P.  pecten-aboriginum is a tree up to 15 m tall. The immature stems are up to 22 cm wide with 10 or 11 ribs. Mature stems are up to 17.5 cm wide with 10 to 12 ribs. The areoles bear rigid, sharp, white to gray spines, which may be curved on mature stems.

The flower is white and about 5.0 to 7.5 cm long. It opens in the evening and closes by midday. The ovary is coated in velvety brown hairs. The floral bracts are linear with long-attenuated tips covering the development of flower buds. Flowering occurs January through March.

The fruit is densely covered with long, golden yellow spines up to 6 cm long. It ripens by June and July. It splits at maturity to reveal a thin layer of firm, red, juicy pulp and shiny black seeds, each about 0.5 cm long.

Biology
P.  pecten-aboriginum is a diploid plant. Its floral biology differs across its range. In Tehuacán, it is pollinated at night by nectar-feeding bats. In the Sonoran desert, the flowers stay open longer in the day to attract both nocturnal and diurnal pollinators.

Uses

Food
The fruit can be eaten raw or cooked, and can be made into a syrup or preserves or jam. It has been used to make wine. The Mayo people made tortillas from the ground seeds mixed with some corn meal. This so-called etcho-seed flour was used in breakfast foods such as pancakes.

Medicinal
The Mayo used the cactus as an herbal remedy. Pieces of the flesh were applied to wounds to inhibit bleeding. The cactus flesh was cooked in salted water and the solution was applied to infected wounds three times daily, followed by a sulfathiazole powder. The juice was consumed as an herbal tonic and to treat sore throat.

Grooming
The fruits were used as combs by indigenous peoples. To make a hairbrush, the spines were removed from about two-thirds of the fruit, and the remaining spines were trimmed to about 1 cm in length.

References 

Pachycereus
Plants described in 1886
Endemic flora of Mexico